Agustín García may refer to:

 Agus (footballer) (born 1985), Spanish footballer
 Agustín García (skier) (born 1980), Argentine alpine skier
 Agustín García Calderón, president of the Supreme Court of El Salvador
 Agustín García Calvo (1926–2012), Spanish philologist, philosopher, poet and playwright
 Agustín García Basso (born 1992), Argentine footballer